Dave Puddington (born ) is a former American football coach.  He served as the head football coach at Washington University in St. Louis from 1962 to 1967 and at  Kent State University from 1968 to 1970, compiling a career college football coaching record of 45–37–3. Puddington is a native of Canton, Ohio.  He played football and basketball at Ohio Wesleyan University.  After serving in the United States Navy, Puddington began his coaching career as an assistant to Jack Fouts at Fairmont High School in Kettering, Ohio.  He was appointed head football coach there in 1958 and led his team to a 9–0 record and a seventh-place ranking among high schools in the state that season.  In 1959 Pudding moved to Kent State, where he served a backfield coach under Trevor J. Rees for three seasons.

Puddington resigned as head coach at Kent State following the 1970 season, noting "the prevailing contagious negativism on campus and in the community".  Four students had been killed that May in the Kent State shootings. Puddington returned to coaching for one season in 1977 at Lake Braddock Secondary School in Burke, Virginia.

Following his coaching career, Puddington worked in fundraising and public relations for Ohio University, West Virginia Wesleyan College, Thomas Edison State University, and Morrisville State College.  He and his wife, Jean, moved to Lowville, New York in 2009.

Head coaching record

College

References

Year of birth missing (living people)
1920s births
Living people
American men's basketball players
American football centers
American football linebackers
Kent State Golden Flashes football coaches
Ohio University people
Ohio Wesleyan Battling Bishops football players
Ohio Wesleyan Battling Bishops men's basketball players
Washington University Bears football coaches
High school football coaches in Ohio
High school football coaches in Virginia
United States Navy officers
Coaches of American football from Ohio
Players of American football from Canton, Ohio
Basketball players from Canton, Ohio
Military personnel from Ohio